The Southeast Northeast Interconnection Gas Pipeline (GASENE) is a  natural gas pipeline system in Brazil, which connects south-eastern gas system to the north-eastern  gas system.  It creates a common gas market in Brazil and allows gas import from Bahia.  The project company of the GASENE system is Transportadora GASENE S.A., a subsidiary of Petrobras.

Pipeline sections
GASENE starts from the Cabiúnas Terminal in Rio de Janeiro and runs to the city of Catu in Bahia.  The project comprises the following sections: 

 Cabiúnas - Vitória (GASCAV) 
 Vitória - Cacimbas 
 Cacimbas  – Catu (GASCAC)

GASCAV pipeline 
This section has two compressor stations. This section was designed and constructed by Chinese oil company Sinopec. The Cabiúnas-Vitória section was completed at the end of 2007.

Vitória - Cacimbas pipeline

GASCAC pipeline 
The construction of Cacimbas - Catu pipeline started in May 2008 and it was completed in 2010. The pipe has a  nominal diameter and it has one compressor station. The pipeline was designed, engineered, and built by Sinopec and financed by China Development Bank.

References 

Natural gas pipelines in Brazil
Petrobras